The 1952 season was the Chicago Bears' 33rd in the National Football League. The team failed to improve on their 7–5 record from 1951 and finished at 5–7 under head coach and owner George Halas, fifth in the NFL's National Conference. In 1952, the club continued its downward trend from the class of the league.

Regular season

Schedule 

Note: Intra-conference opponents are in bold text.

Game summaries

Week 1

Standings

References 

Chicago Bears
Chicago Bears seasons
Chicago Bears